Vitreoretinopathy may refer to:

Autosomal dominant neovascular inflammatory vitreoretinopathy (ADNIV), a rare inherited autoimmune uveitis, first identified in 1990 
Familial exudative vitreoretinopathy, a genetic eye disorder
Proliferative vitreoretinopathy, a disease that develops as a complication to rhegmatogenous retinal detachment

Eye diseases